Dimboola is a town in Victoria, Australia.

Dimboola may also refer to:
 Dimboola railway station
 Dimboola Memorial Secondary College
 Shire of Dimboola, a local government area of Victoria from 1885 to 1995
 Dimboola (play), a 1969 play by Jack Hibberd
 Dimboola (1973 film), a 1973 recording of the play
 Dimboola (1979 film), a 1979 film based on the play
 , a ship involved in the 1919 Fremantle Wharf riot

See also
 Dimbula, a village in Sri Lanka